Angama Mara is a safari lodge in the Maasai Mara in Kenya.

History 
The lodge was developed by Steve and Nicky Fitzgerald and opened in June 2015. It is located on the site where several scenes of Sydney Pollack's Out of Africa (1985) were filmed. It was chosen for the film as the landscape reflected what the Ngong Hills just outside Nairobi would have looked like in Karen Blixen's time, before the area became urbanised. Guests can see Denys Finch Hatton's "burial site" from the movie and also experience an Out of Africa picnic in the same location where the film's original poster was photographed.

Accommodation 
Angama Mara comprises two separate camps of 15 tents each. Each camp has its own guest area, kitchen and staff. 

In 2020, Angama Safari Camp opened. It is a light footprint, sole-use camp comprising four guest tents, sleeping a maximum of eight people.

Wildlife 

Angama Mara has a private entrance to the  Mara Triangle where all game drives take place. The Mara Triangle has abundant year-round wildlife, including the Big Five. It is also where the Great Migration enters and exits the Maasai Mara National Reserve and crosses the Mara River.

Angama Foundation 
Guests contribute a small nightly donation to the Angama Foundation which has been set up as a separate non-profit entity. These funds are used for various initiatives in the fields of education, healthcare and conservation. 

The Angama Foundation works closely with neighbouring schools and several conservation organisations including the Mara Conservancy, the Mara Elephant Project and the Anne K. Taylor Fund. It has also built a clinic on the property of Angama Mara for guests, staff and the neighbouring communities. 

The Angama Foundation was the creator of The Greatest Maasai Mara Photographer of the Year competition.

Accolades 
In 2018, Angama Mara was listed in Condé Nast Traveler as the #1 resort in Africa. It has also received other accolades including being featured in the Travel + Leisure World's Best Awards in 2020 and Fodor's Finest Hotels in 2020.

References

External links 
 

Resorts in Africa
2015 establishments in Kenya